Billy (born ) was an enslaved man from Virginia who was charged with treason during the American Revolution. He was pardoned in 1781 after a letter was written arguing that, as a slave, he was not a citizen and thus could not commit treason against a government to which he owed no allegiance.

Pre-trial life
Very little is known about Billy's life aside from his trial. He was likely born around 1754 and historians believe that he is possibly the same Billy that was enslaved by the wealthy planter John Tayloe II who had one of his employees place an advertisement about a runaway "mulatto" in 1774. In the advertisement Tayloe's employee stated that Billy was a runaway slave and an extremely skilled worker. Historian Lathan A. Windley believes that during this time Billy purchased a forged pass with the intent to liberate himself by travelling to another state.

Trial
On April 2, 1781 Billy was indicted by the Prince William County Court for committing treasonous acts against the state of Virginia. Billy had been charged with joining the British forces aboard an armed vessel with the intent to fight against the colonies during the American Revolutionary War. This was not an uncommon accusation during this time period, as many slaves had been promised their freedom in return for fighting for the British (see Black Loyalists); however, Billy argued that he had been forced on to the ship and that he had never taken up arms. Despite this, Billy was convicted and sentenced to death by hanging.

Two of the jury members, Henry Lee II and William Carr, along with Mann Page, argued against Billy's death sentence and wrote a letter to Thomas Jefferson, then Governor of Virginia, to appeal for clemency. Lee and Carr felt that a slave "not being Admitted to the Privileges [sic] of a Citizen owes the State No Allegiance and that the Act declaring what shall be treason cannot be intended by the Legislature to include slaves who have neither lands or other property to forfeit." Their actions were successful, as Jefferson granted Billy a temporary reprieve and Billy was officially pardoned by the state legislature on June 14. Nothing was written of what happened to Billy after he was pardoned.

Later reception
Lee and Carr's argument contrasted with previous, similar cases of slaves charged with treason. Historians H. J. Eckenrode and Philip J. Schwarz commented on the decision, with Eckenrode writing that this "was a new doctrine, fruit of Revolutionary humanitarianism" and Schwartz stating that "His case was doubly ironic. A slave, he was nevertheless tried for disobeying one of the laws of the commonwealth. Excluded from the protections conferred by citizenship, he was still shielded from execution because Virginia's law of treason could not logically apply to him."

Notes

References

1750s births
Year of death unknown
Place of death unknown
Date of death unknown
Place of birth unknown
Date of birth unknown
18th-century American slaves
African Americans in the American Revolution
Prisoners sentenced to death by Virginia
Recipients of American gubernatorial pardons
People convicted of treason against the United States